Paul Fjellboe (August 11, 1873 – June 9, 1948) was a Norwegian-born American painter and violinist.

Life
Fjellboe was born as Paulmar Thorsten Jansen on August 11, 1873, in Odal, Norway. He emigrated to the United States in 1905, at age 32.

Fjellboe became an oil painter in Salt Lake City, where he had a studio on Main Street. His work was exhibited in New York City and Washington, D.C. He was also a violinist with the Norwegian choir in Salt Lake City.

Fjellboe was a member of the Church of Jesus Christ of Latter-day Saints. He died on June 9, 1948, in Salt Lake City, and he was buried in the Salt Lake City Cemetery. His work can be seen at the Springville Museum of Art.

References

1873 births
1948 deaths
Norwegian emigrants to the United States
American male painters
American male violinists
20th-century Norwegian violinists
20th-century American painters
Burials at Salt Lake City Cemetery
20th-century American male musicians
20th-century American male artists
20th-century American violinists